Michele Ischia (born 5 March 1978) is an Italian footballer who plays as a defender. Ischia can play right-back or centre-back, having spent most of his career in Italian Lega Pro.

Biography
Born in Rovereto, Trentino, Ischia started his career at hometown club Arco, located in the comune of the same name. He then moved Trento, his first professional club.

Frosinone
Ischia terminated his contract with Palazzolo in January 2005 and joined Frosinone. He was the right back of the team and extended his contract in June. He won the promotion playoffs in 2006. He played to more season with the club in Serie B before left on loan to Cavese in 2008.

Return to Lega Pro
In 2009, he was sold to Rimini, to exchange with Migjen Basha. 

In October 2010, he left for Barletta as free agent, where he played as a centre-back. In the next season he was signed by Lecco.

References

External links
Lega Serie B profile 

Italian footballers
Serie B players
Vis Pesaro dal 1898 players
Frosinone Calcio players
Rimini F.C. 1912 players
A.S.D. Barletta 1922 players
Calcio Lecco 1912 players
Association football defenders
People from Rovereto
1978 births
Living people
Sportspeople from Trentino
Footballers from Trentino-Alto Adige/Südtirol